Marojejya darianii, the big-leaf palm, is a species of flowering palm tree in the family Arecaceae. It is found only in Madagascar. It is critically endangered, and threatened with extinction due to habitat loss.

References

darianii
Endemic flora of Madagascar
Critically endangered plants
Taxonomy articles created by Polbot